Ill Will Records was an American vanity record label founded by Nasir "Nas" Jones. The label was named after Willie "Ill Will" Graham, Nas' childhood neighbor and best friend, who was shot dead on May 23, 1992, when both were teenagers. Nas founded the label in 1999 following the release of "Nastradamus"  with the help of Steve Stoute who was the manager of Nas.

After signing to Def Jam in 2005, Nas relaunched Ill Will by the name The Jones Experience as an imprint under Def Jam Recordings.

Early life of Willie Graham
Willie "Ill Will" Graham was born 1972 in Queensbridge Houses, New York City. Willie Graham, Nas' best friend and upstairs neighbor, influenced Nas' interest in hip hop by playing him records. As a teenager, Nas enlisted Graham as his DJ. Nas first went by the nickname Kid Wave before adopting his more commonly known alias of Nasty Nas.

Former artists
Nas
Bravehearts
Nature

Former producers
Trackmasters
L.E.S.
Salaam Remi
Arkatech Beatz

Discography

References

American record labels
Nas
Hip hop record labels
Record labels established in 1999
Record labels disestablished in 2005
Vanity record labels
Hardcore hip hop record labels
1999 establishments in the United States